Laura Kraft (born 1 December 1990) is a German politician of the Alliance 90/The Greens who has been a member of the Bundestag since the 2021 German federal election, representing the Siegen-Wittgenstein district.

Political career 
In parliament, Kraft serves on the Committee on Education, Research and Technology Assessment, the Committee on the Environment, Nature Conservation, Nuclear Safety and Consumer Protection and the Subcommittee on Foreign Cultural and Educational Policy.

In addition to her committee assignments, Kraft has been a member of the German delegation to the Franco-German Parliamentary Assembly since 2022. She is also part of the German-Nordic Parliamentary Friendship Group, which is in charge of maintaining inter-parliamentary relations with Denmark, Finland, Iceland, Norway and Sweden.

Other activities 
 University of Siegen, Member of the Board of Trustees (since 2022)
 German National Association for Student Affairs, Ex-Officio Member of the Board of Trustees (since 2022)

References 

Living people
1990 births
People from Hofgeismar
21st-century German politicians
21st-century German women politicians
Members of the Bundestag for Alliance 90/The Greens
Members of the Bundestag 2021–2025
Female members of the Bundestag